Mutants in Orbit is an adventure and sourcebook for the After the Bomb and Rifts role-playing games, authored by James Wallis and Kevin Siembieda. It was released by Palladium Books in March 1992. The book deals with life of space colonies. The setting is on the same time scale as the After the Bomb and Rifts, but from the space colonies' point of view.

Publication history
At GenCon 22 in 1989, Erick Wujcik introduced James Wallis to Kevin Siembieda of Palladium Books, leading to Wallis becoming involved in the publication of role-playing game supplements through Mutants in Avalon (1990) and Mutants in Orbit (1992). Mutants in Orbit functioned as a sourcebook for both the Rifts and After the Bomb role-playing games.

References

1992 books
After the Bomb (game)
Rifts (role-playing game)